Kark-e Sofla (also Romanized as Kark-e Soflá; also known as Kark) is a village in Giyan Rural District, Giyan District, Nahavand County, Hamadan Province, Iran. At the 2006 census, its population was 589, in 136 families.

References 

Populated places in Nahavand County